Edna May Wonacott (born February 6, 1932) is an American former child actress, best known for her role as Ann Newton in the 1943 movie Shadow of a Doubt. The director, Alfred Hitchcock, and film producer Jack H. Skirball handpicked the then-nine year old for the film while she was waiting for the bus. At that time she had absolutely no experience as an actress.

Wonacott received a seven-year contract and Hitchcock predicted that she would become a star within a year. Other than Shadow of a Doubt, she made minor (uncredited) appearances in several films, including The Bells of St. Mary's and The Model and the Marriage Broker, then retired at age 20.

Personal life
Wonacott is the daughter of Mr. and Mrs. Elie Wonacott of Santa Rosa, California. In 1951, she married Robert Royce Green and had three sons. As of 2010, she resides in Yuma, Arizona under the name Edna Green.

Filmography

References

External links

1932 births
Living people
American child actresses
People from Willits, California
Actresses from California
21st-century American women